Irisya is an administrative ward in the Singida Rural district of the Singida Region of Tanzania. According to the 2002 census, the ward has a total population of 4,905.

References

Wards of Singida Region